Morena Martínez Franchi (born ) is an Argentine volleyball player. She is part of the Argentina women's national volleyball team and participated at the 2016 Women's Pan-American Volleyball Cup, the FIVB Volleyball World Grand Prix (in 2014, 2015, 2016), the 2018 FIVB Volleyball Women's World Championship, and the 2016 Summer Olympics in Brazil.

At club level she played for Velez Sarsfield before moving to Budowlani Toruń in August 2016.

Clubs
  Vélez Sarsfield (–2016)
  Budowlani Toruń (2016–present)

References

External links
 Profile at FIVB.org
 Profile  at Budowlani Toruń

1993 births
Living people
Argentine women's volleyball players
Volleyball players from Buenos Aires
Olympic volleyball players of Argentina
Volleyball players at the 2016 Summer Olympics
Liberos